RasGEF domain family member 1C is a protein that in humans is encoded by the RASGEF1C gene.

References

Further reading